Gaulin is a French surname which is most prevalent among French Canadians and which may have been derived via Gaudelin from the Medieval Germanic feminine name Godelind/Godelinde/Gotlind/Gotlinde (Old High German got "god", "deity" + OHG lind "gentle", "soft", "mild"). Notable people with this name include:

André Gaulin (born 1936), French Canadian politician
Huguette Gaulin (1944–1972), French Canadian novelist
Jean-Marc Gaulin (born 1962), Canadian ice hockey player
Rémi Gaulin (1787–1857), Canadian Roman Catholic bishop
Sasha Gaulin, American actress and circus performer

References

French-language surnames